Alison Louder is a Canadian actress. She is known for her roles as Sister Amy on Helix and Emily Levison on Being Human, both for SyFy. She was voted #3 Best Local Actress in Cult Montreals 2014 Best of Montreal  poll.

Career
On-screen, Louder is best known for her work on the SyFy Network. She guest-starred as fan-favourite Sister Amy on season two of Helix (SyFy and Sony Pictures) and held a recurring role on the series Being Human (SyFy and Muse Entertainment) as Emily Levison.

Honours
 2014 #3 Best Local Actress  - Best of Montreal
2013 #4 Best Local Actress - Best of Montreal
2008-2009 MECCA Awards Dracula, Fallen Angel Productions: Best Production (nominated), Best Director (nominated), Best Ensemble (nominated)
 2010 Frankie Awards, Hot Pink, Next Stage Award runner-up

Filmography

Movies

TV movies

TV shows

Theatre

Voice and animation

References

External links 
 
 @AlisonLouder on Twitter
 Facebook page
 Amanda Rosenthal Talent Agency Inc.

Canadian film actresses
Canadian television actresses
Living people
Year of birth missing (living people)